The Tylee Cottage Residency is an artist-in-residence programme facilitated by the Sarjeant Gallery in Whanganui, New Zealand. Established in 1986, the scheme began as a partnership between the Sarjeant Gallery, the Wanganui District Council and the QEII Arts Council of New Zealand (now known as Creative New Zealand). It is currently managed by the Sarjeant Gallery and funded by the Wanganui District Council. Each year, the selected artist works full-time on their work for 2–12 months and resides in Tylee Cottage. Tylee Cottage was built in 1853 and is one of Whanganui's oldest homes.

List of artists-in-residence
Since the Tylee Cottage Residency was established in 1986, the artists-in-residence have been:

1986 Laurence Aberhart
1987 Andrew Drummond
1988 Mervyn Williams
1989 Anne Noble
1990 Sue Cooke
1991 Emare Karaka
1992 Dennis Turner
1993 Ans Westra
1994 Gary Freemantle
1995–96 Peter Ireland
1996 John Beard
1997 Andrew Smith
1997–98 George Krause
1998 Julian Hooper
1999 Bronwynne Cornish
1999 Victor Meertens
2000 Jeff Thomson
2000 Sarah Buist and Sonia van Kerkhoff
2000–01 Marcus Williams and Susan Jowsey
2001–02 Lauren Lysaght
2002 Alastair Galbraith
2002 Jean Zuber
2002–03 Gregor Kregar
2003–04 Andrea du Chatenier
2004 Johanna Pegler
2005 Christine Hellyar
2005 Paul Johns
2005–06 Ben Cauchi
2006–07 Matt Couper
2007 Mark Braunias
2007 Joanna Langford
2007–08 Regan Gentry
2008 James Robinson
2009 Andrew Ross
2009 Miranda Parkes
2009–10 Kay Walsh
2010 Emily Valentine Bullock
2010–11 Liyen Chong
2011 John Roy
2011 Glenn Burrell
2011–12 Charles Butcher and Cobi Cockburn
2012 Adrian Jackman
2012 Alexis Neal
2012–13 Ann Shelton
2014 Richard Orjis
2014–15 Cat Auburn
2015 Roberta Thornley
2015 Sam Mitchell
2016 Erica van Zon
2016 Wendy Fairclough
2016 Susan Frykberg
2017 Peter Trevelyan
2017–18 Conor Clark
2018 Kate Fitzharris
2018-19 Julia Holden
2019 Annie Mackenzie
2019 Marie Shannon
2019-20 Jae Hoon Lee
2020 Laurence Aberhart
2020 Matthew McIntyre-Wilson
2020 Anne Noble
2021 Graham Fletcher
2021 Zahra Killeen-Chance
2021 Solomon Mortimer
2022 Andrew McLeod
2022 Denis O'Connor

References

New Zealand art awards
Whanganui
1986 establishments in New Zealand